New Kingdom may refer to:

New Kingdom of Egypt
New Kingdom (band)
New Kingdom (album)

See also
 New (disambiguation)
 Kingdom (disambiguation)
 New Empire (disambiguation)